Mariusz Śrutwa (born 15 July 1971 in Bytom) is a former Polish footballer who played as a striker.

References

External links
 

1971 births
Living people
Polish footballers
Poland international footballers
Association football forwards
Polonia Bytom players
Ruch Chorzów players
Legia Warsaw players
Ekstraklasa players
Sportspeople from Bytom